Miarinarivo may refer to several places in Madagascar:
 Miarinarivo, a city in Itasy Region.
 Miarinarivo II, a rural municipality in Itasy Region, covering the villages around Miarinarivo
 Miarinarivo, Andilamena, a rural municipality in Andilamena District, Alaotra-Mangoro Region.
 Miarinarivo, Vavatenina, a rural municipality in Vavatenina District, Analanjirofo Region.